The Caxton Society was founded in the United Kingdom in 1845 to promote the publication of inexpensive and convenient editions of medieval literature, including chronicles, that had not yet appeared in print. It was named after William Caxton, the 15th-century English merchant who may have been the first to use the printing press in England, and listed thirty-three founding members, among whom were Samuel Wilberforce, Bishop of Oxford, Merton College Library, Oxford, the Deputy Keeper of the Public Record Office, the then president of Trinity College, Oxford, the library of the Writers to the Signet and the antiquarian Thomas Wright. Members did not pay a subscription, but were required to buy at least one publication: these were funded by income from sales. The Society ceased operating in 1854, by which time it had published at least 15 volumes.

References

Footnotes

Notes

Bibliography

Defunct organisations based in London
Text publication societies
1845 establishments in England
1854 disestablishments in England